Likino-Dulyovo is a town in Orekhovo-Zuyevsky District of Moscow Oblast, Russia, located  northeast of Moscow. Population: 

The village of Dulyovo has grown around the Dulyovo porcelain works. The urban-type settlement of Likino-Dulyovo was formed in 1930 by merging the settlements of Likino and Dulyovo. Town status was granted to it in 1937. One of the town products, the LiAZ city bus, was universally known throughout the former Soviet Union.

Within the framework of administrative divisions, it is incorporated within Orekhovo-Zuyevsky District as the Town of Likino-Dulyovo. As a municipal division, the Town of Likino-Dulyovo is incorporated within Orekhovo-Zuyevsky Municipal District as Likino-Dulyovo Urban Settlement.

The town is home to the avant-garde porcelain factory workers' club designed by Konstantin Melnikov in 1930.

Twin towns and sister cities

Likino-Dulyovo is twinned with:
 Aksaray, Turkey
 Székesfehérvár, Hungary

References

Notes

Sources

External links
Official website of Likino-Dulyovo 
Unofficial website of Likino-Dulyovo

Cities and towns in Moscow Oblast
Pokrovsky Uyezd